Dr. (Sow.) Indirabai Bhaskarrao Pathak Mahila Kala Mahavidyalaya, is a general degree women's college situated in Aurangabad, Maharashtra. It was established in the year 1970 and first women's college in Marathwada region. The college is affiliated with Dr. Babasaheb Ambedkar Marathwada University.

Departments
Marathi
English
Hindi
Sanskrit
History
Political Science
Psychology
Economics
Sociology
Home Science
Computer Science
Sports
Music
Commerce

Accreditation
The college is  recognized by the University Grants Commission (UGC).

References

External links
http://www.ibpmahilacollege.org/

Dr. Babasaheb Ambedkar Marathwada University
Universities and colleges in Maharashtra
Educational institutions established in 1970
1970 establishments in Maharashtra